Adolphe Hercule de Graslin (11 April 1802, Chateaux de Malitourne, Flée, Sarthe – 31 May 1882, Malitourne) was a French entomologist.

Adolphe Hercule de Graslin specialised in Lepidoptera. He was a founding member of the Société Entomologique de France. His collection was acquired by Charles Oberthür.

Works
With Jean Alphonse Boisduval and Jules Pierre Rambur, he wrote Collection iconographique et historique des chenilles; ou, Description et figures des chenilles d'Europe, avec l'histoire de leurs métamorphoses, et des applications à l'agriculture, Paris, Librairie encyclopédique de Roret, 1832.

References
Anonym 1883: [Graslin, A. H. de] Annales de la Société entomologique de France (6), Paris 3: 561-564
Letacq; Gerbault, E. 1918: [Graslin, A. H. de] Le Mans, Monnoyer		
[Marseul, S. A. de] 1889: Les Entomologistes et leurs Écrits. L'Abeille. Journal d'entomologie. Cinquieme. série. , Paris.
Reiche, L. 1882: [Graslin, A. H. de] Annales de la Société Entomologique de France (6), Bulletin, Paris  CIX

External links
Collection iconographique et historique des chenilles; ou, Description et figures des chenilles d'Europe, avec l'histoire de leurs métamorphoses, et des applications à l'agriculture 
through Gallica
through Google Books

French lepidopterists
1802 births
1882 deaths
People from Sarthe
19th-century French zoologists